Wilson Creek is a stream in the U.S. state of Indiana. It is a tributary to the Ohio River.

Wilson Creek was named after a pioneer settler who was killed by Indians.

References

Rivers of Indiana
Rivers of Dearborn County, Indiana
Tributaries of the Ohio River